Cornulaca is a genus of flowering plants belonging to the family Amaranthaceae.

Its native range is Western Tropical Africa to China.

Species:

Cornulaca alaschanica 
Cornulaca aucheri 
Cornulaca ehrenbergii 
Cornulaca korshinskyi 
Cornulaca monacantha 
Cornulaca setifera

References

Amaranthaceae
Amaranthaceae genera